Bosome-Freho is one of the constituencies represented in the Parliament of Ghana. It elects one Member of Parliament (MP) by the first past the post system of election. Akwasi Boateng is the current member of parliament (MP) for the constituency. He was elected on his own ticket and won a majority of 1,076 votes to become the MP. He had also represented the constituency in the 4th Republic parliament.

See also
List of Ghana Parliament constituencies

References 

Parliamentary constituencies in the Ashanti Region